The Cider Press is a sculpture by Thomas Shields Clarke, installed in San Francisco's Golden Gate Park, in the U.S. state of California.

References

External links
 

Golden Gate Park
Monuments and memorials in California
Outdoor sculptures in San Francisco
Sculptures of men in California
Statues in California